HLA-DQ5 (DQ5) is a human leukocyte antigen serotype subgroup within HLA-DQ(DQ) serotypes. The serotype is determined by the antibody recognition of β5.x subset of DQ β-chains. The β-chain of DQ is encoded by HLA-DQB1 locus and DQ5 are encoded by the HLA-DQB1 allele group. HLA-DQ5 and HLA-DQB1*05 are almost synonymous in meaning. DQ5 β-chains combine with α-chains, encoded by genetically linked HLA-DQA1 alleles, to form the cis-haplotype isoforms. These isoforms, are all HLA-DQ1 encoded by the  DQA1 allele group.

Serology

The efficiency of DQ1 recognition relative to DQ5 and DQ6 is listed above. Since
DQ1 recognizes alpha, the DQ5 and DQ6 recognition are to beta chain. Meaning
that DQ1 is corecognized with DQ5 and DQ6. Efficient recognition of a genotyped allele approaches 100%. Compared to DQ2 serotyping of DQB1*0201 positive individuals (98%), the efficiency of DQ5 recognition is relatively low and error prone.

While DQ5 recognizes DQB1*05 alleles more efficiently than DQ1, the serotyping is rather poor method of typing for transplantation or disease association prediction or study.

Disease associations

By serotype
DQ5 is negatively associated with (protective against) idiopathic nephrotic syndrome in Polish children, and adrenocortical failure (Addison's disease).

A study on the relationship between HLA-DR, DQ antigen, and intracranial aneurysm in the Han nationality show DQ5 more likely, AIDP type of Guillain Barré syndrome, and irritable bowel disease  but not crohn's disease in the same (Jewish) population. Other studies show DQ5 is associated with extra-intestinal manifestations of Crohn's.

DQ5 appears to be associated with analgesic intolerance.

By haplotype
MuSK antibody-positive myasthenia gravis HLA-DR14-DQ5, probably DRB1 : DQA1 : DQB1 (DR14-DQ5). DR1-DQ5 is associated with sensitivity to acid anhydrides.

References

5